Niels Bennike (August 6, 1925 – March 8, 2016) was a Danish football player.

External links
 Danish national team profile
 Stats
 Death notice

1925 births
2016 deaths
Footballers from Copenhagen
Danish men's footballers
Denmark international footballers
Denmark under-21 international footballers
Danish expatriate men's footballers
Expatriate footballers in Italy
Expatriate footballers in France
Kjøbenhavns Boldklub players
S.P.A.L. players
Genoa C.F.C. players
Serie A players
Serie B players
Ligue 1 players
Association football midfielders